Alove for Enemies was a Christian hardcore band from Long Island, New York, US. They claim Shai Hulud, Darkest Hour, and Few Left Standing as their influences.

Biography
The band was founded in 1999, and released their first six-song EP independently in 2000. The group was founded by singer Erich Barto and drummer A.J. Gonzalez. The band was signed to independent label Polytope records and toured twice under this label. After A.J. Gonzalez left the band, they replaced Gonzalez with Mike Desario  for most of 2003. In late 2003 Jon Hernandez joined just before the band  signed to Californian label Strikefirst Records, a subsidiary of Facedown Records. They released the EP Broken Pledge in December 2003 and played many gigs to support it.

In March 2004 Alove for Enemies signed with the main Facedown Records label. A year later, the album The Harvest was released; it was supported by a full US tour and by a European tour in spring 2005.

2006 saw the release of The Resistance on Facedown Records. All the song titles on the album are references to the movie Equilibrium.

On September 4, 2007, Alove For Enemies announced their break up on their Myspace blog. They played  Facedown Fest East Coast in Maryland as their penultimate show, on Sept. 29, 2007. Their final show was played on Long Island Oct. 5, 2007. Former guitar player Bill Meis joined them for "Center of Attention" and "Angels Don't Burn".

On May 14th, 2012, Alove For Enemies announced a reunion show for August 17th at the annual Long Island Fest 3 day Hardcore Festival. No further shows have been announced.

Members
Last Known Lineup
Erich Barto - vocals (1999-2007, 2012, 2014-present) (now has solo project Emissary)
Matt Addeo - guitar (1999-2007, 2012, 2014-present)
Dan Valentino - guitar (2005-2007, 2012, 2014-present) (now in Shepherds)
Luke Anthony - bass/vocals (1999-2007, 2012, 2014-present)
Andy Amato - drums (2012, 2014-present) (was in  Letter To The Exiles)

Past members
Bill Meis - guitar (1999-2005, final shows 2007)
Mike Desario - drums (2003)
AJ Gonzales - drums (1999-2003)
Jon Hernandez - drums  (2003-2007)
Dan Lomeli - drums (2007)

Discography
Demos
 Tread On My Dreams
 Hour Of Decision
 The Silent Rival (2003)
Studio albums
 The Truth of Trumpets (Polytope Records) (2001)
 Broken Pledge (Strike First Records) (2003)
 The Harvest (Facedown Records) (2005)
 Resistance (Facedown Records) (2006)

Music videos

 Tread On My Dreams (Resistance) -2006
 The Hour Of Decision (The Harvest) -2005

References

External links
 Alove for Enemies Myspace
 Erich Barto interviewed by Highwire Daze (2006)
 Official site at PureVolume

Christian hardcore musical groups
Musical groups from Long Island
Hardcore punk groups from New York (state)
Musical groups established in 2000